Marcel Hénaff (July 21, 1942 – June 11, 2018) was a French philosopher and anthropologist. He taught at the Collège international de philosophie and the University of California, San Diego. He was the author of several books, including two about Claude Lévi-Strauss.

References

1942 births
2018 deaths
People from Savoie
French expatriates in the United States
University of California, San Diego faculty
21st-century French philosophers
French anthropologists